Vangelis Raptopoulos [Βαγγέλης Ραπτόπουλος] (born 1959, Athens, Greece) is a Greek novelist and considered a part of the "1980s generation".

Career

His first work In Pieces was published in 1979, at the age of 20. His first two books have been adapted for the television, Loula, Black Wedding and The Invention of Reality have been adapted for the theater, while The Bachelor was brought to the screen.  The Cicadas came out in English and The Incredible Story of Pope Joan in Italian. He has published around 30 books.

He has worked as a consultant in Greek publishing houses, a scenario consultant on various television channels, a newspaper columnist, a screenwriter, a producer and speaker on radio programs; he teaches Creative Writing at the Hellenic Open University as an adjunct lecturer. His personal archive has been donated to the Gennadius Library.

Works
My Generation: In Pieces, Toll Post, The Cicadas (Η γενιά μου: Κομματάκια, Διόδια, Τα τζιτζίκια)
The Imperial Memory of Blood (Η αυτοκρατορική μνήμη του αίματος)
The Bachelor (Ο εργένης)
Obsessions (Έμμονες ιδέες)
Loula (Λούλα)
The Incredible Story of Pope Joan (Η απίστευτη ιστορία της Πάπισσας Ιωάννας)
Black Wedding (Μαύρος γάμος)
Does Simitis Listen to Mitropanos? (Ακούει ο Σημίτης Μητροπάνο;)
My Own America (Η δική μου Αμερική)
The Invention of Reality (Η επινόηση της πραγματικότητας)
We Lost Dad (Χάσαμε τον Μπαμπά)
A Bit of History of Modern Greek Literature (Λίγη ιστορία της νεοελληνικής λογοτεχνίας)
Φίλοι (Friends)
Ancient Recipe: Herodotus, Heraklitus, Lucian (Αρχαία συνταγή: Ηρόδοτος, Ηράκλειτος, Λουκιανός)
The Great Sand (Η Μεγάλη Άμμος)
Τales of Limni: The Game, Sad and Deep As You, Endlessly Empty House (Ιστορίες της Λίμνης: Το παιχνίδι, Βαθύς και λυπημένος όπως κι εσύ, Απέραντα άδειο σπίτι)
The High Art of Failure (Η υψηλή τέχνη της αποτυχίας)
The Most Secret Wound (Η πιο κρυφή πληγή)
F8alism (Μοιρολα3)
Lesbian (Λεσβία)
The Man Who Burned Down Greece (Ο άνθρωπος που έκαψε την Ελλάδα)
The Best Things That Ever Happened To Me (Ό,τι καλύτερο μου έχει συμβεί)
Untouched (Ανέγγιχτη)

See also 
 Modern Greek literature
 List of Greek writers

References

External links

Official page
Archive of Vangelis Raptopoulos, The American School of Classical Studies at Athens
Member of the BOD of Hellenic Authors' Society

His books on Biblionet

1959 births
Living people
Greek novelists
International Writing Program alumni
Writers from Athens